Sofia Catharina Margarita Fölster (born 17 December 1991) is a Swedish politician for the Moderate Party, and member of the Riksdag from 2014 to 2018. She was the first vice president of the Moderate Party youth group (MUF) from 2016 to 2018. Her father is author Stefan Fölster.

References 

1991 births
Living people
Women members of the Riksdag
Politicians from Stockholm
Members of the Riksdag from the Moderate Party
21st-century Swedish women politicians